Melani Nanai (born 3 August 1993) is a Samoan rugby union player who plays as an outside back for the .

Early career

Born and raised in Samoa, Nanai came to New Zealand to attend high school at De La Salle College in the southern part of Auckland.   He later returned home to his native Samoa at the end of his 5th form in 2009 before returning to New Zealand in 2011.   He worked packing boxes and doing dispatch in East Tāmaki while playing club rugby, first for Otahuhu and latterly for Manukau Rovers where he came under the wing of All Black legend, Frank Bunce. His brother, Kitiona Vai, is currently contracted to the All Blacks 7's squad whilst his youngest brother Cody Vai, was named in the NZ Secondary School's Team for 2022.

Senior career

Although not initially named in the Auckland squad for the 2014 ITM Cup, Nanai's impressive form at club level for Manukau Rovers saw him break into their top team and make 5 appearances during the campaign which ended with him being named development player of the year.

He joined Premiership Rugby side Worcester Warriors ahead of the 2019–20 season. He remained at the club until the end of the 2022 season before returning to New Zealand.

In July, 2022, he signed to play NPC with Bay of Plenty alongside younger brother Kitiona. Unfortunately due to long-term injuries, neither took the field during the season, but in October 2022, it was announced Melani would sign for the Crusaders for the 2023 Super Rugby Pacific Competition.

Super Rugby

Just 5 appearances at provincial level were enough to convince Auckland-based Super Rugby franchise the Blues to name him in their wider training group for the 2015 Super Rugby season.   He enjoyed a hugely impressive debut campaign playing at Super Rugby level, making 13 starts in the outside back positions and scoring 3 tries. Tana Umaga replaced Sir John Kirwan as Blues head coach ahead of the 2016 Super Rugby season and he promoted Nanai to their first team squad. Again he was a regular through 2016, mostly in the fullback position vacated by Charles Piutau and this time he scored 5 times in 11 appearances.

Melani continued to play for the Blues until 2019, gaining 64 appearances for the franchise and in the same year winning the award for Blues’ Players Player of the Year.

In 2023 he will return to Super Rugby in a move to the Crusaders.

International

Nanai was a member of the Samoa Under-20 team which competed in the 2013 IRB Junior World Championship in France where he scored 3 tries in 5 appearances.

He also played in the number 15 jersey for the Barbarians in their 31–31 draw against  at Wembley Stadium on 5 November 2016.   He scored the game's opening try in the 4th minute.

Super Rugby statistics

References

External link
 

1993 births
Living people
Samoan rugby union players
Rugby union wings
Rugby union fullbacks
Rugby union centres
Auckland rugby union players
Blues (Super Rugby) players
Worcester Warriors players
Sportspeople from Apia
Barbarian F.C. players
Samoan emigrants to New Zealand
Bay of Plenty rugby union players
Crusaders (rugby union) players